The capuchin monkeys are New World monkeys of the subfamily Cebinae. They are readily identified as the "organ grinder" monkey, and have been used in many movies and television shows. The range of capuchin monkeys includes some tropical forests in Central America and South America as far south as northern Argentina. In Central America, where they are called white-faced monkeys ("carablanca"), they usually occupy the wet lowland forests on the Caribbean coast of Costa Rica and Panama and deciduous dry forest on the Pacific coast.

Etymology 

The word "capuchin" derives from a group of friars named the Order of Friars Minor Capuchin, an offshoot from the Franciscans, who wear brown robes with large hoods. When Portuguese explorers reached the Americas in the 15th century, they found small monkeys whose coloring resembled these friars, especially when in their robes with hoods down, and named them capuchins. When the scientists described a specimen (thought to be a golden-bellied capuchin) they noted that: "his muzzle of a tanned color,... with the lighter color around his eyes that melts into the white at the front, his cheeks..., give him the looks that involuntarily reminds us of the appearance that historically in our country represents ignorance, laziness, and sensuality." The scientific name of the genus, Cebus comes from the Greek word kêbos, meaning a long-tailed monkey.

Classification 

The species-level taxonomy of this subfamily remains highly controversial, and alternative treatments than the one listed below have been suggested.

In 2011, Jessica Lynch Alfaro et al. proposed that the robust capuchins (formerly the C. apella group) be placed in a separate genus, Sapajus, from the gracile capuchins (formerly the C. capucinus group) which retain the genus Cebus. Other primatologists, such as Paul Garber, have begun using this classification.

According to genetic studies led by Lynch Alfaro in 2011, the gracile and robust capuchins diverged approximately 6.2 million years ago. Lynch Alfaro suspects that the divergence was triggered by the creation of the Amazon River, which separated the monkeys in the Amazon north of the Amazon River, who then evolved into the gracile capuchins.  Those in the Atlantic Forest south of the river evolved into the robust capuchins. Gracile capuchins have longer limbs relative to their body size than robust capuchins, and have rounder skulls, whereas robust capuchins have jaws better adapted for opening hard nuts. Robust capuchins have crests and the males have beards.

 Genus Cebus
 Colombian white-faced capuchin or Colombian white-headed capuchin, Cebus capucinus
 Panamanian white-faced capuchin or Panamanian white-headed capuchin, Cebus imitator
 Marañón white-fronted capuchin, Cebus yuracus
 Shock-headed capuchin, Cebus cuscinus
 Spix's white-fronted capuchin, Cebus unicolor
 Humboldt's white-fronted capuchin, Cebus albifrons
 Guianan weeper capuchin, Cebus olivaceus
Chestnut weeper capuchin, Cebus castaneus
 Ka'apor capuchin, Cebus kaapori
 Venezuelan brown capuchin, Cebus brunneus
 Sierra de Perijá white-fronted capuchin, Cebus leucocephalus
 Río Cesar white-fronted capuchin, Cebus cesare
 Varied white-fronted capuchin, Cebus versicolor
 Santa Marta white-fronted capuchin, Cebus malitiosus
 Ecuadorian white-fronted capuchin, Cebus aequatorialis

 Genus Sapajus
 Black-capped, brown or tufted capuchin, Sapajus apella
 Guiana brown capuchin, Sapajus apella apella
 Sapajus apella fatuellus
 Large-headed capuchin, Sapajus apella macrocephalus
 Margarita Island capuchin, Sapajus apella margaritae
 Sapajus apella peruanus
 Sapajus apella tocantinus
 Blond capuchin, Sapajus flavius*
 Black-striped capuchin, Sapajus libidinosus
 Sapajus libidinosus juruanus
 Sapajus libidinosus libidinosus
 Sapajus libidinosus pallidus
 Sapajus libidinosus paraguayanus
 Azaras's capuchin, Sapajus cay
Black capuchin, Sapajus nigritus
 Sapajus nigritus cucullatus
 Sapajus nigritus nigritus
 Crested capuchin or robust tufted capuchin, Sapajus robustus
 Golden-bellied capuchin, Sapajus xanthosternos

* Rediscovered species.

The oldest known crown platyrrhine and member of Cebidae, Panamacebus transitus, is estimated to have lived 21 million years ago. It is the earliest known fossil evidence of a mammal travelling between South and North America.

Physical characteristics 

Capuchins are black, brown, buff or whitish, but their exact color and pattern depends on the species involved. Capuchin monkeys are usually dark brown with a cream/off-white coloring around their necks. On average, they weigh from 1.4 to 4 kg (3 to 9 pounds) and live up to 25 years old in their natural habitats, and up to 35 in captivity.

Habitat and distribution 

Capuchins prefer environments that give them access to shelter and easy food, such as low-lying forests, mountain forests, and rain forests. They are particularly abundant in Argentina, Brazil, Costa Rica, Honduras, Paraguay, and Peru. They use these areas for shelter at night and food access during the day. The canopy of the trees allows for protection from threats above, and the capuchin monkeys' innate ability to climb trees with ease allows them to escape and hide from predators on the jungle floor. This environment is mutually beneficial for the capuchins and for the ecosystem in which they inhabit. This is because they spread their seed leftovers and fecal matter across the forest floor which helps new plants to grow, therefore adding to the already abundant foliage that shelters the capuchin.

Behavior 

Like most New World monkeys, capuchins are diurnal and arboreal. Capuchins are polygamous, and the females mate throughout the year, but only go through a gestation period once every 2 years between December and April. Females bear young every two years following a 160- to 180-day gestation. The young cling to their mother's chest until they are larger, then they move to her back. Adult male capuchin rarely take part in caring for the young. Juveniles become fully mature within four years for females and eight years for males. In captivity, individuals have reached an age of 50 years, although natural life expectancy is only 15 to 25 years. Capuchins live in groups of 6-40 members, consisting of related females, their offspring, and several males.

Diet 

The capuchin monkey feeds on a vast range of food types, and is more varied than other monkeys in the family Cebidae. They are omnivores, and consume a variety of plant parts such as leaves, flower and fruit, seeds, pith, woody tissue, sugarcane, bulb, and exudates, as well as arthropods, molluscs, a variety of vertebrates, and even primates. Recent findings of old stone tools in Capuchin habitats have suggested that recently the Capuchins have switched from small nuts, such as cashews, to larger and harder nuts. Capuchins have also been observed to be particularly good at catching frogs. They are characterized as innovative and extreme foragers because of their ability to acquire sustenance from a wide collection of unlikely food, which may assure their survival in habitats with extreme food limitation. Capuchins living near water will also eat crabs and shellfish by cracking their shells with stones.

Social structure 

Capuchin monkeys often live in large groups of 10 to 35 individuals within the forest, although they can easily adapt to places colonized by humans. The Capuchins have discrete hierarchies that are distinguished by age and sex. Usually, a single male will dominate the group, and he will have primary rights to mate with the females of the group. However, the white-headed capuchin groups are led by both an alpha male and an alpha female. Each group will cover a large territory, since members must search for the best areas to feed. These primates are territorial animals, distinctly marking a central area of their territory with urine and defending it against intruders, though outer areas may overlap. The stabilization of group dynamics is served through mutual grooming, and communication occurs between the monkeys through various calls. Their vocal communications have various meanings such as creating contact with one another, warning about a predator, and forming new groups. The social experience of the capuchins directly influences the development of attention in society. They create new social behaviors within multiple groups that signify different types of interactions. These include; tests of friendship, displays against enemies, infant and sexual intimacy. This creates social rituals that are designed to test the strength of social bonds and a reliance on social learning.

Mating 

Capuchin females often direct most of their proceptive and mating behavior towards the alpha male. However, when the female reaches the end of her proceptive period, she may sometimes mate with up to six different subordinate males in one day. Strictly targeting the alpha male does not happen every time, as some females have been observed to mate with three to four different males. When an alpha female and a lower-ranking female want to mate with an alpha male, the more dominant female will get rights to the male over the lower-ranking one.

Intelligence 

The capuchin is considered to be the most intelligent New World monkey and is often used in laboratories. The tufted monkey is especially noted for its long-term tool usage, one of the few examples of primate tool use other than by apes and humans. Upon seeing macaws eating palm nuts, cracking them open with their beaks, this monkey will select a few of the ripest fruits, nip off the tip of the fruit and drink down the juice, then seemingly discard the rest of the fruit with the nut inside. When these discarded fruits have hardened and become slightly brittle, the capuchin will gather them up again and take them to a large flat boulder where they have previously gathered a few river stones from up to a mile away. They will then use these stones, some of them weighing as much as the monkeys, to crack open the fruit to get to the nut inside. Young capuchins will watch this process to learn from the older, more experienced adults but it takes them 8 years to master this. The learning behavior of capuchins has been demonstrated to be directly linked to a reward rather than curiosity.

In 2005, experiments were conducted on the ability of capuchins to use money. After several months of training, the monkeys began exhibiting behaviors considered to reflect an understanding of the concept of a medium of exchange that were previously believed to be restricted to humans (such as responding rationally to price shocks). They showed the same propensity to avoid perceived losses demonstrated by human subjects and investors.

During the mosquito season, they crush millipedes and rub the result on their backs. This acts as a natural insect repellent.

Self-awareness 

When presented with a reflection, capuchin monkeys react in a way that indicates an intermediate state between seeing the mirror as another individual and recognizing the image as self.

Most animals react to seeing their reflections as if encountering another individual they do not recognize. An experiment with capuchins shows that they react to a reflection as a strange phenomenon, but not as if seeing a strange capuchin.

In the experiment, capuchins were presented with three different scenarios:
 Seeing an unfamiliar, same-sex monkey on the other side of a clear barrier
 Seeing a familiar, same-sex monkey on the other side of a clear barrier
 A mirror showing a reflection of the monkey

In scenario 1, females appeared anxious and avoided eye-contact, while males made threatening gestures. In scenario 2, there was little reaction by either males or females.

When presented with a reflection, females gazed into their own eyes and made friendly gestures, such as lip-smacking and swaying. Males made more eye contact than with strangers or familiar monkeys but reacted with signs of confusion or distress, such as squealing, curling up on the floor, or trying to escape from the test room.

Theory of mind 

The question of whether capuchin monkeys have a theory of mind—whether they can understand what another creature may know or think—has been neither proven nor disproven conclusively. If confronted with a knower-guesser scenario, where one trainer can be observed to know the location of food and another trainer merely guesses the location of food, capuchin monkeys can learn to rely on the knower. This has, however, been repudiated as conclusive evidence for a theory of mind as the monkeys may have learned to discriminate knower and guess by other means. Until recently it was believed that non-human great apes did not possess a theory of mind either, although recent research indicates this may not be correct. Human children commonly develop a theory of mind around the ages 3 and 4.

Threats 

Capuchin monkeys are clever and easy to train. As a result, they are used to help people who are quadriplegics in many developed countries. They have also become popular pets and attractions for street entertainment, and are hunted for meat by local people. Since they have a high reproductive rate and can easily adapt to their living environment, loss of the forest does not negatively impact the capuchin monkey populations as much as other species, although habitat fragmentation is still a threat. Natural predators include jaguars, cougars, jaguarundis, coyotes, tayras, snakes, crocodiles and birds of prey. The main predator of the tufted capuchin is the harpy eagle, which has been seen bringing several capuchin back to its nest.

Relationship with humans 

Easily recognized as the "organ grinder" or "greyhound jockey" monkeys, capuchins are sometimes kept as exotic pets. Sometimes they plunder fields and crops and are seen as troublesome by nearby human populations. In some regions, they have become rare due to the destruction of their habitat.

They are also used as service animals, sometimes being called "nature's butlers". One organization has been training capuchin monkeys to assist quadriplegics as monkey helpers in a manner similar to mobility assistance dogs. After being socialized in a human home as infants, the monkeys undergo extensive training before being placed with a quadriplegic. Around the house, the monkeys help out by doing tasks including fetching objects, turning lights on and off, and opening drink bottles.

In 2010, the U.S. federal government revised its definition of service animal under the Americans with Disabilities Act (ADA). Non-human primates are no longer recognized as service animals under the ADA. The American Veterinary Medical Association does not support the use of nonhuman primates as assistance animals because of animal welfare concerns, the potential for serious injury to people, and risks that primates may transfer dangerous diseases to humans.

Capuchin monkeys are the most common featured monkeys in film and television, with notable examples including: Night at the Museum (and its sequels), Outbreak, Pirates of the Caribbean: The Curse of the Black Pearl (and its sequels), Zookeeper, George of the Jungle, and The Hangover Part II. Ross Geller (David Schwimmer) on the NBC sitcom Friends had a capuchin monkey named Marcel. Crystal the Monkey is a famous monkey actress.

References

External links 

 Primate Info Net Cebus Factsheets

 
Tool-using mammals
Extant Miocene first appearances